David Johnston (born 1941) is a former governor general of Canada.

David Johnston or Dave Johnston may also refer to:

Politics
 David Johnston (Australian politician) (born 1956), Australian Senator and former Defence Minister
 David Johnston (British politician) (born 1981), British politician
 David Emmons Johnston (1845–1917), U.S. Congressman
 David Russell Johnston (1932–2008), Scottish politician

Sports 
 David Johnston (Australian footballer) (born 1969), former Australian rules footballer
 Davie Johnston (footballer, born 1942) (1942–2004), Scottish footballer, played for Heart of Midlothian FC and Aberdeen FC
 Davie Johnston (footballer, born 1948), Scottish footballer, played for Dundee FC
 David Johnston (rugby union, born 1958), Scottish rugby player and coach, also played football for Heart of Midlothian FC
 David Johnston (English cricketer) (born 1943), former English cricketer
 David Johnston (South Australia cricketer) (born 1954), Australian cricketer
 David Johnston (New South Wales cricketer) (born 1955), Australian cricketer
 David Johnston (rugby union, born 1994), Irish rugby player
 D. T. Johnston (1889–1953), Australian sportsman and local politician

Others
 David Johnston (minister) (1734-1824) Church of Scotland minister of Leith
 Dave Johnston (musician), American banjo player for Yonder Mountain String Band
 Dave Johnston (police officer), head of the Homicide and Serious Crime Command for the Metropolitan Police (United Kingdom)
 David Johnston (builder), specialist in environmentally friendly building and construction
 David Johnston (newsreader) (born 1941), former Australian newsreader
 David A. Johnston (1949–1980), volcanologist killed in the 1980 eruption of Mount St. Helens
 David Cay Johnston (born 1948), investigative journalist
 David Claypoole Johnston (1799–1865), American cartoonist, printmaker, painter and actor
 David E. Johnston, British classical archaeologist and historian
 David Johnston (admiral) (born 1962), senior officer in the Royal Australian Navy
 David Eric Lothian Johnston (born 1961), Scottish legal expert
 David Johnston (merchant) (1724–1809), American merchant and politician
 David Jhave Johnston, Canadian poet, videographer, and motion graphics artist
 David Johnston (soldier) (1838-1931) American soldier and recipient of the Medal of Honor

See also
 David Johnson (disambiguation)